This Conversation Seems Like a Dream was the first solo album by American rock artist Kip Winger. The album was released by Domo Records in 1997. A limited edition bonus disc was included with the Japanese release of the album, which also featured alternate cover art.

Track listing
 "Kiss of Life" (Kip Winger, Noble Kime) – 4:23
 "Monster" (Winger) – 5:47
 "Endless Circles" (Winger, Joel Tippie) – 5:31
 "Angel of the Underground" (Winger, Andy Timmons, Kime) – 5:37
 "Steam" (Winger, Paul Winger) – 3:58
 "I'll Be Down (Winger, Kime) – 4:33
 "Naked Son" (Winger) – 3:56
 "Daniel" (Winger) – 4:18
 "How Far Will We Go?" (Winger) – 4:45
 "Don't Let Go" (Winger) – 4:44
 "Here" (Winger) – 5:20

Limited Edition Japanese-Only Bonus Disc
 "Kiss of Life" (Demo) – 5:00 
 "Monster" (Demo) – 4:37 
 "Free" (Instrumental) – 3:47  otherwise unreleased track
 "Headed for a Heartbreak" (Demo 1987) – 4:58 
 "Hour of Need" (Demo) – 4:54 
 "Now and Forever" – 4:52  otherwise unreleased track

Personnel
 Kip Winger – vocals, guitars, bass guitar, keyboards, sound effects, mandolin
 Andy Timmons – guitars
 Marc Sculman – guitars
 Rich Kern – guitars
 Rod Morgenstein – drums
 Robby Rothschild – Percussion
 Mark Clark – Percussion
 Alan Pasqua – piano
 Noble Kime – piano
 Greta Rose – backing vocals
 Beatrice Winger – backing vocals
 Paul Winger – backing vocals
 Nate Winger – backing vocals
 Pete Cotutsca – sound effects
 Jordan Rudess – announcer voice on "Ill Be Down"
 Jonathan Arthur – flute
 Chris Botti – trumpet
 Adam Gonzalez – cello
 David Felberg – violin, viola
 Willy Sucre – strings
 Jonathan Amerding – strings

Album credits
 Produced and engineered by Kip Winger
 2nd Engineer, Computer/Midi Technician: Pete Cotutsca
 Mixed by Mike Shipley, except "Daniel" mixed by Kip Winger
 Recorded and mixed at Rising Sun Studios, Santa Fe, NM 
 Mastered by Doug Sax and Gavin Lurssen at The Mastering Lab
 All arrangements by Kip Winger, except "I'll Be Down", "Naked Son" by Kip Winger and Noble Kime, "Endless Circles" by Kip Winger and Pete Cotutsca
 All string arrangements by Kip Winger
 Cover art and design by Beatrice Richter-Winger
 Cover photography by Chris Corrie

See also
Winger

External links
 The official Kip Winger website

1997 debut albums
Albums produced by Kip Winger